Šrī Krishnakarṇāmrutam ( श्रीकृष्णकर्णामृतम् ) is a work in Sanskrit by the poet Shree Bilvamangala Swami variously known as Vilvamangalam Swami, Vilwamangalam Swamiyar, Bilwamangala Thakura and Līlāśuka. The word karṇāmruta means 'nectar to the ears'. Līlāśuka compares that [Pronoun needs to be clarified] to a bouquet of glory of Krishna.

Origin 

The author of Šrī Krishnakarṇāmrutam is Vilvamangalam Swamiyar. He was a contemporary of Swami Desikan (AD 1268-1369). Since he described with great joy the līlās of Krishna like , the author of Bhagavata Purana, he came to be known as Līlāśuka. Tradition has it that Līlāśuka belonged to a śaiva ('shaivaite') family. But he became a devotee of Krishna. Hence he refers to his traditional background by saying that he wears the feet of Lord Siva on his head. He belonged to the tradition of great devotees of Krishna of Kerala such as Nārāyaṇa Bhattathiri, the author of Srī Nārāyaṇīyam, Pūnthānam and Vāsudeva Nambūdiri and other great scholars of Daśama skandham of Bhāgavata Purāṇa.

Controversy 

Some say that Līlāśuka belonged to a place called Mukkutalai, originally Mukti-sthalam in kerala, which Telugu scholars refute by saying that Līlāśuka has covered a vast area of south India when Andhra, Karnataka and Maharashtra states were one province.

For Indian (Bharatiya), controversy word is used. For non Indians, speculation word is used. [Sentence needs to be re-written. Context not clearly established.]
As per a folklore in Dakshina Kannada (Karnataka) / Kasaragod (Kerala) region, Bilwamangala Swami (Līlāśuka) was from Ananthapura, the famous Lake temple.

Legend 

In his early life, he had an illicit love affair with Cintamani, a dancing girl who was a musician and harlot. She teased him once about his scholarship in Vyākaraṇam, Nāṭakam and Alankāra-śāstram, and told him that if he had one thousandth of the affection for Bhagavān, he would easily save his life.[The sentence is unclear and needs to be re-written for clarity.] That was the turning point for Bilva Mangala. He thanked Lord Krishna for showing the true destiny of his life and immersed himself in devotional service to Lord Krishna. He started his masterpiece called Krishna Karaamrutham with the śloka:

"cintāmaṇir-jayati-somagirir-gurur-mé" (चिन्तामणिर्जयति सोमगिरिर्गुरुर्मे) which means my guru Somagiri who is like cintAmaNi, the wish-giving stone is victorious.[Translation needs to be improved]

There are 328 slokas in this masterwork. He concludes with the last slokam with the passage:

"līlāśukéna racitam tava déva kṛṣṇakarṇāmṛtam vahatu kalpa-śatāntaré'pi" (लीलाशुकेन रचितं तव देव कृष्ण कर्णामृतम् वहतु कल्प शतान्तरेऽपि) which means may this work composed by Leelasuka create a flow of nectar for the span of time beyond one hundred kalpa [Translation needs to be improved]!

There is a tradition to worship Krishna as Gopala Sundari. The mantra for worship in that manner has 33 beejaaksharams and is made up of Sri Rajagopaala Mantra's 18 letters and the 15 letters of Sri Pancha Dasakshari of Sri Vidya. In fact, the Lord of Raja Mannargudi (Dakshina Dwaraka), Sri Rajagopalan is meditated upon as Sri Vidya Rajagopalan. Sri Leela Sukhar worshipped this Madana Gopala Sundari form (Dhyana Slokam 3-104 of Krishna Karnaamrutham).[Some competent scholar needs to edit this for relevance and clarity.]

According to some legends, Chaitanya Mahaprabhu discovered this work in Andhra on the last day of his visit to Andhra and assigned copying work to a dozen copyists, instructing them to copy it overnight. They could copy only first chapter in that night; later, on his returning to Vanga province, he found it to be incomplete, and then Mahaprabhu sent disciples to Andhra to fetch a complete copy of this work.

References

External links

1] NIITAIVEDA > All Scriptures By Acharyas > Bilvamangala Thakura > Krishna Karnamrita

2] Ahobilavalli Grantha Mala, pdf file from Ahobilavalli Series, Sri Leela Sukar's KrishNa Karnamrutam, translated by Dr.Smt.Saroja Ramanujam, M.A., Ph.D

3]   At Kunjeshwari.com > Translated by Madhumatidasi Adhikari. It contains the commentaries by Sri Chaitanya Mahaprabhu's associates Srila Krishnadas Kaviraj Goswami, Srila Gopal Bhatta Goswami and Srila Chaitanyadas Goswami. The excerpts can also be viewed in SweetBlog.

4] Vedic Talks - Sri Krishna Karnamrutham - a nectar to the ears

See also
Vilwamangalam Swamiyar
Sree Padmanabhaswami Temple

Sanskrit texts
Krishna
Hindu devotional texts